The biological classification system of life introduced by British zoologist Thomas Cavalier-Smith involves systematic arrangements of all life forms on earth. Following and improving the classification systems introduced by Carl Linnaeus, Ernst Haeckel, Robert Whittaker, and Carl Woese, Cavalier-Smith's classification attempts to incorporate the latest developments in taxonomy. His classification has been a major foundation in modern taxonomy, particularly with revisions and reorganisations of kingdoms and phyla.

Cavalier-Smith has published extensively on the classification of protists. One of his major contributions to biology was his proposal of a new kingdom of life: the Chromista, although the usefulness of the grouping is questionable given that it is generally agreed to be an arbitrary (polyphyletic) grouping of taxa. He also proposed that all chromista and alveolata share the same common ancestor, a claim later refuted by studies of morphological and molecular evidence by other labs.  He named this new group the Chromalveolates. He also proposed and named many other high-rank taxa, like Opisthokonta (1987), Rhizaria (2002), and Excavata (2002), though he himself consistently does not include Opisthonkonta as a formal taxon in his schemes. Together with Chromalveolata, Amoebozoa (he amended their description in 1998), and Archaeplastida (which he called Plantae since 1981) the six formed the basis of the taxonomy of eukaryotes in the middle 2000s. He has also published prodigiously on issues such as the origin of various cellular organelles (including the nucleus, mitochondria), genome size evolution, and endosymbiosis. Though fairly well known, many of his claims have been controversial and have not gained widespread acceptance in the scientific community to date. Most recently, he has published a paper citing the paraphyly of his bacterial kingdom, the origin of Neomura from Actinobacteria and taxonomy of prokaryotes.

According to Palaeos.com: Prof. Cavalier-Smith of Oxford University has produced a large body of work which is well regarded. Still, he is controversial in a way that is a bit difficult to describe.  The issue may be one of writing style. Cavalier-Smith has a tendency to make pronouncements where others would use declarative sentences, to use declarative sentences where others would express an opinion, and to express opinions where angels would fear to tread. In addition, he can sound arrogant, reactionary, and even perverse. On the other [hand], he has a long history of being right when everyone else was wrong. To our way of thinking, all of this is overshadowed by one incomparable virtue: the fact that he will grapple with the details. This makes for very long, very complex papers and causes all manner of dark murmuring, tearing of hair, and gnashing of teeth among those tasked with trying to explain his views of early life. See, [for example], Zrzavý (2001) [and] Patterson (1999).  Nevertheless, he deals with all of the relevant facts.

Eight kingdoms model

The first two kingdoms of life: Plantae and Animalia

The use of the word "kingdom" to describe the living world dates as far back as Linnaeus (1707–1778) who divided the natural world into three kingdoms: animal, vegetable, and mineral. The classifications "animal kingdom" (or kingdom Animalia) and "plant kingdom" (or kingdom Plantae) remain in use by modern evolutionary biologists. The protozoa were originally classified as members of the animal kingdom. Now they are classified as multiple separate groups.

The third kingdom: Protista

By mid-nineteenth century, microscopic organisms were generally classified into four groups: 
Protozoa (primitive animals),
Protophyta (primitive plants),
Phytozoa (animal-like plants & plant-like animals), and
In 1858, Richard Owen (1804–1892) proposed that the animal phylum Protozoa be elevated to the status of kingdom. In 1860, John Hogg (1800–1869) proposed that protozoa and protophyta be grouped together into a new kingdom which he called "Regnum Primigenum" (kingdom primitive). According to Hogg, this new classification scheme prevented "the unnecessary trouble of contending about their supposed natures, and of uselessly trying to distinguish the Protozoa from the Protophyta". In 1866, Ernst Haeckel (1834–1919) proposed the name "Protista" for the primigenial kingdom and included bacteria in this third kingdom of life.

The fourth kingdom: Fungi

 
By 1959, Robert Whittaker proposed that fungi, which were formerly classified as plants, be given their own kingdom. Therefore, he divided life into four kingdoms such as: 
Protista, (or unicellular organisms);
Plantae, (or multicellular plants);
Fungi; and
Animalia (or multicellular animals).
Whittaker subdivided the Protista into two subkingdoms: 
 Monera (bacteria) and
 Eunucleata (single celled eukaryotes).

The fifth kingdom: Bacteria (Monera)

Bacteria are fundamentally different from the eukaryotes (plants, animals, fungi, amebas, protozoa, and chromista). Eukaryotes have cell nuclei, bacteria do not. In 1969, Whittaker elevated the bacteria to the status of kingdom. His new classification system divided the living world into five kingdoms:
Plantae,
Animalia,
Protista (Eunucleata),
Fungi, and
Monera (the kingdom bacteria).

The sixth kingdom: Archaebacteria

The kingdom Monera can be divided into two distinct groups: eubacteria (true bacteria) and archaebacteria (archaea). In 1977 Carl Woese and George E. Fox established that archaebacteria (methanogens in their case) were genetically different (based on their ribosomal RNA genes) from bacteria so that life could be divided into three principle lineages, namely:
Eubacteria (all typical bacteria),
Archaebacteria (methanogens), and
Urkaryotes (all eukaryotes).
In 1990, Woese introduced domain above kingdom  by creating three-domain system such as:
Bacteria,
Archaea, and
Eucarya.
But Cavalier-Smith considered Archaebacteria as a kingdom.

The seventh kingdom: Chromista

By 1981, Cavalier-Smith had divided all the eukaryotes into nine kingdoms. In it, he created Chromista for a separate kingdom of some protists.

Most chromists are photosynthetic. This distinguishes them from most other protists which lack photosynthesis. In both plants and chromists photosynthesis takes place in chloroplasts. In plants, however, the chloroplasts are located in the cytosol while in chromists the chloroplasts are located in the lumen of their rough endoplasmic reticulum. This distinguishes chromists from plants.

Based on the addition of Chromista as a kingdom, he suggested that even with his nine kingdoms of eukaryotes, "the best one for general scientific use is a system of seven kingdoms", which includes:
Plantae,
Animalia,
Protozoa,
Chromista
Fungi,
Eubacteria, and
Archaebacteria.

The eighth kingdom: Archezoa

In 1983, Cavalier-Smith introduced Archezoa for (which he called) primitive protists that lack mitochondria. He originally considered it as a subkingdom, but by 1989, with the establishment of Chromista as separate kingdom, he treated it as a kingdom.

Archezoa is now defunct. He now assigns former members of the kingdom Archezoa to the phylum Amoebozoa.

Kingdom Protozoa sensu Cavalier-Smith

Cavalier-Smith referred to what remained of the protist kingdom, after he removed the kingdoms Archezoa and Chromista, as the "kingdom Protozoa". In 1993, this kingdom contained 18 phyla as summarized in the following table:

The phylum Opalozoa was established by Cavalier-Smith in 1991.

Six kingdoms models

By 1998, Cavalier-Smith had reduced the total number of kingdoms from eight to six:  Animalia, Protozoa, Fungi, Plantae (including red and green algae), Chromista, and Bacteria.

Five of Cavalier-Smith's kingdoms are classified as eukaryotes as shown in the following scheme:  
Eubacteria
Neomura
Archaebacteria
Eukaryotes
Kingdom Protozoa
 Unikonts (heterotrophs)
Kingdom Animalia
Kingdom Fungi
 Bikonts (primarily photosynthetic)
Kingdom Plantae (including red and green algae)
Kingdom Chromista

Eukaryotes are divided into two major groups: Unikont and Bikont. Uniciliates are cells with only one flagellum and unikonts are descended from uniciliates. Unikont cells often have only one centriole as well. Biciliate cells have two flagella and bikonts are descended from biciliates. Biciliates undergo ciliary transformation by converting a younger anterior flagellum into a dissimilar older posterior flagellum. Animals and fungi are unikonts while plants and chromists are bikonts.  Some protozoa are unikonts while others are bikonts.

The Bacteria (= prokaryotes) are subdivided into Eubacteria and Archaebacteria. According to Cavalier-Smith, Eubacteria is the oldest group of terrestrial organisms still living. He classifies the groups which he believes are younger (archaebacteria and eukaryotes) as Neomura.

The 1998 model

Kingdom Animalia 

In 1993, Cavalier-Smith classified Myxozoa as a protozoan parvkingdom. By 1998, he had reclassified it as an animal subkingdom. Myxozoa contains three phyla, Myxosporidia, Haplosporidia, and Paramyxia, which were reclassified as animals along with Myxozoa. Likewise, Cavalier-Smith reclassified the protozoan phylum Mesozoa as an animal subkingdom.

In his 1998 scheme, the animal kingdom was divided into four subkingdoms:  
 Radiata (phyla Porifera, Cnidaria, Placozoa, and Ctenophora),
 Myxozoa,
 Mesozoa,  and
 Bilateria (all other animal phyla).

He created five new animal phyla:  
 Acanthognatha (rotifers, acanthocephalans, gastrotrichs, and gnathostomulids),
 Brachiozoa (brachiopods and phoronids),
 Lobopoda (onychophorans and tardigrades),
 Kamptozoa (Entoprocta and Symbion), and
 Nemathelminthes (Nematoda, Nematomorpha, Loricifera, Priapulida, and Kinorhyncha)
and recognized a total of 23 animal phyla, as shown here:
Kingdom Animaia
Subkingdom Radiata
Infrakingdom Spongiaria
Phylum Porifera
Infrakingdom Coelenterata
Phylum Cnidaria
Phylum Ctenophora
Infrakingdom Placozoa
Phylum Placozoa
Subkingdom Myxozoa
Phylum Myxosporidia
Subkingdom Bilateria
Branch Protostomia
Infrakingdom Lophozoa
Superphylum Polyzoa
Phylum Bryozoa
Phylum Kamptozoa (Entoprocta and Cycliophora)
Superphylum Conchozoa
Phylum Mollusca
Phylum Brachiozoa sensu lato (Brachiozoa and Phoronida)
Superphylum Sipuncula
Phylum Sipuncula
Superphylum Vermizoa
Phylum Nemertina
Phylum Annelida
Infrakingdom Chaetognathi
Phylum Chaetognatha
Infrakingdom Ecdysozoa
Superphylum Nemathelminthes
Phylum Nemathelminthes (Nematoda and Nematomorpha; Priapozoa, Kinorhyncha and Loricifera)
Superphylum Haemopoda
Phylum Lobopodia (Onychophora and Tardigrada)
Phylum Arthropoda
Infrakingdom Platyzoa
Phylum Platyhelminthes (incl. Xenacoelomorpha)
Phylum Acanthognatha (incl. Rotifera, Acanthocephala, Gnathostomulida, Gastrotricha)
Branch Deuterostomia
Infrakingdom Coelomopora
Phylum Echinodermata
Phylum Hemichordata
Infrakingdom Chordonia
Phylum Urochorda
Phylum Chordata
Subkingdom Mesozoa
Phylum Mesozoa

Kingdom Protozoa

Under Cavalier-Smith's proposed classification system, protozoa share the following traits:
 they have or are descended from organisms with mitochondria
 they have or are descended from organisms with peroxisomes
 they lack collagenous connective tissue
 they lack epiciliary retronemes (rigid thrust-reversing tubular ciliary hairs)
 they lack two additional membranes outside their chloroplast envelope
Organisms that do not meet these criteria were reassigned to other kingdoms by Cavalier-Smith.

The 2003 model

Kingdom Protozoa

In 1993, Cavalier-Smith divided the kingdom Protozoa into two subkingdoms and 18 phyla. By 2003 he used phylogenic evidence to revise the total number of proposed phyla down to 11: Amoebozoa, Choanozoa, Cercozoa, Retaria, Loukozoa, Metamonada, Euglenozoa, Percolozoa, Apusozoa,  Alveolata, Ciliophora, and  Miozoa.

Unikonts and bikonts

Amoebozoa do not have flagella and are difficult to classify as unikont or bikont based on morphology.  In his 1993 classification scheme, Cavalier-Smith incorrectly classified amoebas as bikonts.  Gene fusion research later revealed that the clade Amoebozoa, was ancestrally uniciliate. In his 2003 classification scheme, Cavalier-Smith reassigned Amoebozoa to the unikont clade along with animals, fungi, and the protozoan phylum Choanozoa. Plants and all other protists were assigned to the clade Bikont by Cavalier-Smith.

Cavalier-Smith's 2003 classification scheme:
 Unikonts
 protozoan phylum Amoebozoa (ancestrally uniciliate)
 opisthokonts
 uniciliate protozoan phylum Choanozoa
 kingdom Fungi
 kingdom Animalia
 Bikonts
 protozoan infrakingdom Rhizaria
 phylum Cercozoa
 phylum Retaria (Radiozoa and Foraminifera)
 protozoan infrakingdom Excavata
 phylum Loukozoa
 phylum Metamonada
 phylum Euglenozoa
 phylum Percolozoa
 protozoan phylum Apusozoa (Thecomonadea and Diphylleida)
 the chromalveolate clade
 kingdom Chromista (Cryptista, Heterokonta, and Haptophyta)
 protozoan infrakingdom Alveolata
 phylum Ciliophora
 phylum Miozoa (Protalveolata, Dinozoa, and Apicomplexa)
 kingdom Plantae (Viridaeplantae, Rhodophyta and Glaucophyta)

Cladogram of life

By September 2003, Cavalier-Smith's tree of life looked like this:

In the above tree, the traditional plant, animal, and fungal kingdoms, as well as Cavalier-Smith's proposed kingdom Chromista, are shown as leaves. The leaves Eubacteria and Archaebacteria together make up the kingdom Bacteria. All remaining leaves together make up the kingdom Protozoa.

By 2006, Cavalier-Smith's microbial tree look like this:

By 2010 new data emerged that showed that Unikonts and Bikonts, originally considered to be separate because of an apparently different organization of cilia and cytoskeleton, are in reality more similar than previously thought. As a consequence, Cavalier-Smith revised the above tree and proposed to move its root to reside in between the Excavata and Euglenozoa kingdoms.

Seven kingdoms model
In 1987, Cavalier-Smith introduced a classification divided into two superkingdoms (Prokaryota and Eukaryota) and seven kingdoms, two prokaryotic kingdoms (Eubacteria and Archaebacteria) and five eukaryotic kingdoms (Protozoa, Chromista, Fungi, Plantae and Animalia).

Cavalier-Smith and his collaborators revised the classification in 2015, and published it in PLOS ONE. In this scheme they reintroduced the classification with the division of prokaryotes superkingdom into two kingdoms, Bacteria (=Eubacteria) and Archaea (=Archaebacteria). This is based on the consensus in the Taxonomic Outline of Bacteria and Archaea (TOBA) and the Catalogue of Life.

References

Taxonomy (biology)
High-level systems of taxonomy